Temnostega antarctica is a species of beetle in the family Carabidae, the only species in the genus Temnostega.

References

Trechinae